Thomas Mair may refer to:
 Thomas Mair (minister) (1701–1768), eighteenth century Scottish minister
 Thomas Mair (born 1963), British criminal; see murder of Jo Cox
 Thomas Mair, co-founder of Mair, Inglis and Evatt

See also
 Thomas Maier, author, journalist, and television producer.
 Thomas Mayer (disambiguation)